William Palmer Maclay (1877–July 31, 1943) was a United States Army private received the Medal of Honor for actions during the Philippine–American War.

He is buried in Arlington National Cemetery, Arlington, Virginia. His grave can be found in section 7, Lot 9008-F.

Medal of Honor citation
Rank and organization: Private, Company A, 43d Infantry, U.S. Volunteers. Place and date: At Hilongas, Leyte, Philippine Islands, May 6, 1900. Entered service at: Altoona, Pa. Birth: Spruce Creek, Pa. Date of issue: March 11, 1902.

Citation:

Charged an occupied bastion, saving the life of an officer in a hand-to-hand combat and destroying the enemy.

See also

List of Philippine–American War Medal of Honor recipients

References

1877 births
1943 deaths
United States Army soldiers
American military personnel of the Philippine–American War
United States Army Medal of Honor recipients
Burials at Arlington National Cemetery
Philippine–American War recipients of the Medal of Honor